WrestleMania is a professional wrestling pay-per-view event produced by the American promotion WWE, formerly known as the World Wrestling Federation (WWF), and is considered the flagship event of the company. The events feature wrestlers from the promotion's roster competing in a variety of professional wrestling matches. The WrestleMania franchise debuted in 1985 with WrestleMania I, and has been produced annually since. WrestleMania 38 in 2022 was the most recent production.

Aside from professional wrestling performances, celebrities have been a major key in the production of WrestleMania events. WWE involves them to attract more hype and media attention for the event, in an effort to boost pay-per-view buys and ticket sales. The celebrities involved with WrestleMania events have come from a range of occupations, including singing, acting, sports, and modeling, and have been used in a variety of roles, such as live musical performances, backstage segments, ringside managers, and on some occasions, competing in a wrestling match.

Overall, there have been 143 celebrities involved at WrestleMania: 55 musicians (with groups counted as one), 34 athletes, 25 actors, and 29 from various other backgrounds. 10 of these celebrities have also been inducted into the celebrity wing of the WWE Hall of Fame.

Celebrities

 – indicates inducted into the celebrity wing of the WWE Hall of Fame

Actors

Athletes

Musicians

Other

References

External links 
 Official WrestleMania website

WrestleMania
Professional wrestling-related lists
WWE lists